János Bartha (6 February 1915 – 1991), better known as John Bartha, was a Hungarian film actor who appeared primarily in Spaghetti Westerns in the 1960s and 1970s. He is probably most recognizable in western cinema for his role as the Sheriff who captured Tuco in the 1966 Sergio Leone film, The Good, the Bad and the Ugly.

He made nearly 80 appearances in film between 1951 and 1981. Bartha died in 1991.

Filmography

 Breakthrough (1950) - U.S. Soldier
 Teljes gözzel (1951) - Román
 Állami áruház (1953)
 Föltámadott a tenger (1953)
 Gázolás (1955)
 Az élet hídja (1956)
 Nerone '71 (1962) - Uomo che interroga le ragazze
 I Am Semiramis (1963) - Althar
 Samson and the Sea Beast (1963)
 The Executioner of Venice (1963) - Messere Leonardo
 The Lion of St. Mark (1963) - Conte Fieschi
 The Pink Panther (1963) - Policeman
 I maniaci (1964) - Literary critic segment "La Parolaccia"
 Man of the Cursed Valley (1964) - Padre Ryan
 The Revenge of Spartacus (1964) - Roman Soldier
 00-2 agenti segretissimi (1964) - Doctor
 The Seven from Texas (1964) - Dan
 Challenge of the Gladiator (1965) - Roman Messenger
 Jesse James' Kid (1965) - Federal
 Our Man in Jamaica (1965)
 Hands of a Gunfighter (1965) - Sheriff Fred
 The Relentless Four (1965) - Rancher John
 A Man Could Get Killed (1966) - Ludmar
 The Man Who Laughs (1966)
 Due mafiosi contro Al Capone (1966) - Police Chief
 Ringo and His Golden Pistol (1966) - Bernard, Barangos Alcalde
 War of the Planets (1966)
 Il pianeta errante (1966) - Dr. Smith
 Le colt cantarono la morte e fu... tempo di massacro (1966) - Carradine
 Arizona Colt (1966) - Soldier Playing Cards with Two Comrades at Stagecoach Station
 Rojo (1966) - Judge
 Target for Killing (1966) - Organisationsmitglied, das Henry Perkins entführt
 Django Shoots First (1966) - Thomas Garvin
 The Good, the Bad and the Ugly (1966) - Sheriff
 El Cisco (1967)
 Dirty Heroes (1967) - Hassler's Subordinate
 La morte viene dal pianeta Aytin (1967) - Dr. George
 Master Stroke (1967) - Movie Producer
 Killer calibro 32 (1967) - Parker
 Son of Django (1967) - Sheriff
 Il tempo degli avvoltoi (1967) - Sheriff
 ...4 ..3 ..2 ..1 ...Morte (1967) - General Ron
 El Desesperado (1967) - Wallace
 Your Turn to Die (1967) - Hotel Detective
 Operation St. Peter's (1967) - Man in flashback
 Seven Times Seven (1968) - Coal-Mining Prisoner
 Se vuoi vivere... spara! (1968) - Businessman
 L'oro di Londra (1968) - Thomas
 Acid (Delirio dei sensi) (1968) - James Burton
 Johnny Hamlet (1968) - Owner of Acting Troupe
I lunghi giorni dell'odio (1968) - Sheriff
A Minute to Pray, a Second to Die (1968) - Townsman
Hell in Normandy (1968) - Ted Bancroft - American General
A Sky Full of Stars for a Roof (1968) - Mr. Lawrence
The Black Sheep (1968) - DDR Ambassador
Carogne si nasce (1968) - Tex Thomas
Three Crosses Not to Die (1968) - Saloon owner
Kill Them All and Come Back Alone (1968) - Prison Camp Captain
Indovina chi viene a merenda? (1969) - German Sergeant
La battaglia del deserto (1969) - German Tank Operator
Uccidete Rommel (1969) - Colonel Braddock
Sabata (1969) - Daugherty City Sheriff
The Conspiracy of Torture (1969) - 2nd Excellency
Sartana the Gravedigger (1969) - Sheriff
The Adventures of Gerard (1970)
I Am Sartana, Trade Your Guns for a Coffin (1970) - Sheriff
Terzo Canale - Avventura a Montecarlo (1970) - Truck Seller
I due maggiolini più matti del mondo (1970) - Anastasia
They Call Me Hallelujah (1971) - Shot Man
His Name Was King (1971) - Sheriff Roberts
Return of Sabata (1972) - Sheriff
Il clan dei due Borsalini (1971) - Il gioielliere
The Eroticist (1972) - Film editor
Jesse & Lester - Due fratelli in un posto chiamato Trinità (1972) - Carson
The Night of the Devils (1972) - Sawmill Owner
Le calde notti del Decameron (1972) - Bishop
Man of the East (1972) - Jeremiah
Don't Torture a Duckling (1972) - Policeman
Sotto a chi tocca! (1972) - Head of Mission
The Master Touch (1972) - Murdered Security Guard
The Sicilian Connection (1972) - Inspector
Continuavano a chiamarli... er più e er meno (1972) - Collector
Fuzzy the Hero (1973) - Sheriff
My Darling Slave (1973) - Car saloon employee
The Great Kidnapping (1973) - Policeman
Mean Frank and Crazy Tony (1973) - District Attorney
Anna, quel particolare piacere (1973) - Gerli
White Fang (1973) - Mountie who frees Chester
Daisy Miller (1974) - Hotel Receptionist Rome
Challenge to White Fang (1974) - Mountie Sergeant
Eyeball (1975) - Mr. Hamilton
Prima ti suono e poi ti sparo (1975) - Towns Representant
Violent Rome (1975) - Junk Yard Worker
Dracula in the Provinces (1975) - Concierge
We Are No Angels (1975) - Sheriff
Salon Kitty (1976) - Gestapo Agent
Everything Happens to Me (1980) - Police Chief
Cannibal Ferox (1981) - Mafioso

References

Bibliography

External links

 
 
 

1915 births
1991 deaths
20th-century Hungarian male actors
Hungarian emigrants to the United States
Hungarian male film actors
Male actors from Budapest
Male Spaghetti Western actors
Male Western (genre) film actors